Leaderless resistance, or phantom cell structure, is a social resistance strategy in which small, independent groups (covert cells), or individuals (a solo cell is called a "lone wolf"), challenge an established institution such as a law, economic system, social order, or government. Leaderless resistance can encompass anything from non-violent protest and civil disobedience to vandalism, terrorism, and other violent activity.

Leaderless cells lack vertical command links and so operate without hierarchical command, but they have a common goal that links them to the social movement from which their ideology was learned.

Leaderless resistance has been employed by a wide range of movements, including animal-liberation, radical environmentalist, anti-abortion, military invasion resistance, anarchist organizations, colonialism resistance, terrorist, and hate groups.

The non-hierarchical, decentralized organization is simple and difficult to stamp out. However, with the absence of a formal hierarchy and formal criteria for membership and affiliation, they are vulnerable to appropriation, false flagging or hostile takeover from the outside, since anyone can declare oneself a member of and affiliate with the group.

General characteristics
A covert cell may be a lone individual or a small group. The basic characteristic of the structure is that there is no explicit communication between cells that are acting toward shared goals. Members of one cell usually have little or no information about who else is agitating on behalf of their cause.

Leaderless movements may have a symbolic figurehead. This can be a public figure, a multiple-use name, or an inspirational author, who picks generic targets and objectives, but does not actually manage or execute plans. Media, in this case, often create a positive feedback loop: by publishing declarations of a movement's role model, this instills motivation, ideas, and assumed sympathy in the minds of potential agitators who in turn lend further authority to the figurehead. While this may loosely resemble a vertical command structure, it is notably unidirectional: a titular leader makes pronouncements, and activists may respond, but there is no formal contact between the two levels of organization.

As a result, leaderless resistance cells are resistant to informants and traitors. As there is neither a center that may be destroyed, nor links between the cells that may be infiltrated, it is more difficult for established authorities to arrest the development of a leaderless resistance movement than it is with movements that adopt more conventional hierarchies.

Given  of leaderless resistance, and the fact that it is often strategically adopted in the face of a power imbalance, it has much in common with guerrilla warfare. The latter strategy, however, usually retains some form of organized, bidirectional leadership and is often more  than the individualized actions of leaderless cells. In some cases, a largely leaderless movement may evolve into a coherent insurgency or guerrilla movement, as with the Yugoslav partisans of World War II.

Leaderless resistance often involves resistance by violent means, but it is not limited to them. Non-violent groups can use the same structure to author, print, and distribute samizdat literature, to create self-propagating boycotts against political opponents via the internet, to maintain an alternative electronic currency outside of the reach of taxing governments and transaction-logging banks, and so forth.

History
The concept of leaderless resistance was developed by Col. Ulius Louis Amoss, a former U.S. intelligence officer, in the early 1950s. An anti-communist, Amoss saw leaderless resistance as a way to prevent the penetration and destruction of CIA-supported resistance cells in Eastern European countries under Soviet control.

The concept was revived and popularized in an essay published by the anti-government Ku Klux Klan member Louis Beam in 1983 and again in 1992. Beam advocated leaderless resistance as a technique for white nationalists to continue the struggle against the U.S. government, despite an overwhelming imbalance in power and resources.

Beam argued that conventional hierarchical pyramidal organizations are extremely dangerous for their participants, when employed in a resistance movement against government, because of the ease of disclosing the chain of command. A less dangerous approach would be to convince like-minded individuals to form independent cells without close communication between each other but generally operating in the same direction.

More contemporary examples of social movements such as the gillets jaunes (yellow vests) in France, Extinction Rebellion, or the #MeToo movement seem to have spontaneously arisen as leaderless movements, perhaps due to the prevalence of social media that bring together individuals with common grievances even in the absence of organized leadership.

In practice

Animal liberation

The first recorded direct action for animal liberation which progressed (after a considerable delay) into a movement of leaderless resistance was by the original "Band of Mercy" in 1824 whose goal was to thwart fox hunters. Inspired by this group and after seeing a pregnant deer driven into the village by fox hunters to be killed, John Prestige decided to actively oppose this sport and formed the Hunt Saboteurs Association (HSA) in 1964. Within a year, a leaderless model of hunt-sabotage groups was formed across the United Kingdom.

A new Band of Mercy was then formed in 1972. It used direct action to liberate animals and cause economic sabotage against those thought to be abusing animals. Ronnie Lee and others changed the name of the movement to the Animal Liberation Front (ALF) in 1976 and adopted a leaderless resistance model focusing broadly on animal liberation.

Earth First! and the environmental movement in the 1980s also adopted the leaderless resistance model. An animal liberation movement advocating violence emerged with the name Animal Rights Militia (ARM) in 1982. Letter bombs were sent to the then British Prime Minister, Margaret Thatcher. Two years later the name Hunt Retribution Squad (HRS) was also used.

The Earth Liberation Front (ELF) formed in 1992, breaking from Earth First! when that organization decided to focus on public direct action, instead of the ecotage that the ELF participated in. A violent group called the Justice Department was established in 1993, and in 1994  to hunters such as Prince Charles and to animal researchers.

In 1999 the leaderless resistance strategy was employed by animal liberation organisations like Stop Huntingdon Animal Cruelty (SHAC), which was formed from the Consort beagles campaign and Save the Hill Grove Cats to close down Huntingdon Life Sciences (HLS). Despite claiming successes leaderless animal liberation and environmental movements generally lack the broad popular support that often occurs in strictly political or military conflicts. The Revolutionary Cells--Animal Liberation Brigade (RCALB) appeared in 2003 and sent pipe bombs to Chiron Corporation and used incendiary devices against other targets.

Within a few years of the victories claimed by the SHAC, other campaigns against animal testing laboratories emerged. At the same time, SPEAK Campaigns and the more radical ALF militants, Oxford Arson Squad began their campaigns towards the same goal: to end Oxford University's animal research.

In April 2009, the Militant Forces Against Huntingdon Life Sciences (MFAH) became active. With the ALF, they began targeting HLS customer and financial Directors, as well as company property. Since then, groups have reported over a dozen actions in Europe, including painting homes, burning cars, and grave desecration. Militants, however, oppose , instead believing in any necessary action to prevent suffering at HLS's laboratories.

Radical Islamists

Leaderless resistance is also often well-suited to terrorist objectives. The Islamist organization Al-Qaeda uses a typical figurehead/leaderless cell structure. The organization itself may be pyramidal, but sympathizers who act on its pronouncements often do so spontaneously and independently.

Given the small, clandestine character of terrorist cells, it is easy to assume they necessarily constitute leaderless resistance models. When there is bidirectional communication with external leadership, however, the label is inappropriate. The men who executed the bombings of the London Underground on July 7, 2005 constituted a leaderless resistance cell in that they purportedly acted out of sympathy for Islamic fundamentalism but under their own auspices. The hijackers involved in the September 11 attacks, by contrast, allegedly received training, direction, and funding from Al-Qaeda, and are not properly designated a leaderless cell.

Neo-Nazis and White nationalists
The concept of leaderless resistance remains important to far-right thinking in the United States, as a proposed response to perceived federal government over-reach at the expense of individual rights. Simson Garfinkel, however, found in his research that for the most part the far right seldom used this tactic. Timothy McVeigh is one example in the United States. McVeigh worked in a small cell which based its attack on motivations widespread among far-right anti-government groups and the militia movement.

Leaderless resistance has been advocated by white supremacist groups such as White Aryan Resistance (WAR) and the British neo-Nazi Combat 18 (C18). The modern Ku Klux Klan is also credited with having developed a leaderless resistance model. Troy Southgate also advocated forms of leaderless resistance during his time as a leading activist in the National Revolutionary Faction and a pioneer of National-Anarchism. James Mason a former American Nazi Party member and neo-Nazi was a proponent of the idea of "leaderless resistance" as detailed in SIEGE a collection of writings from the defunct National Socialist Liberation Front (NSLF) which advocated violence against political opponents, Jews and non-whites of which he deemed to be the supposedly Jewish controlled entity he referred to as "The System" which has since been embraced by the terrorist group Atomwaffen Division (AWD) in the modern day.

Stormfront, Aryan Nations, and Hammerskin Nation (HSN) link to Beam's Leaderless Resistance. These groups promote lone wolf actions.  Stormfront, while regretting the loss of life, explains how Benjamin Nathaniel Smith's 1999 killing spree was compelled by circumstances. The World Church of the Creator (WCOTC) gave a mixed message, calling Smith "a selfless man who gave his life in the resistance to Jewish/mud tyranny," but noting "the Church does not condone his acts."

Examples of modern-day leaderless resistance/lone-wolf terrorism include:

1999 Columbine High School massacre
1999 Los Angeles Jewish Community Center shooting 
1999 murders of Gary Matson and Winfield Mowder
2008 Knoxville Unitarian Universalist church shooting
2009 United States Holocaust Memorial Museum shooting
2011 Norway attacks
2012 Wisconsin Sikh temple shooting
2014 Overland Park Jewish Community Center shooting
2015 Charleston church shooting
2015 Lafayette shooting
2016 murder of Jo Cox
2017 Quebec City mosque shooting
2018 Pittsburgh synagogue shooting
2019 Christchurch mosque shootings
2019 Escondido mosque fire and Poway synagogue shooting
2019 El Paso shooting
2022 Buffalo shooting

Radical environmentalism

Leaderless resistance emerged in the environmental movement in 1976 when John Hanna and others as the Environmental Life Force (ELF) (also known now as the original ELF) used explosive and incendiary devices. The group conducted armed actions in northern California and Oregon, later disbanding in 1978 following Hanna's arrest for placing incendiary devices on seven crop-dusters at the Salinas, California airport on May Day, 1977. A decade and a half later this form of guerrilla warfare resurfaced using the same acronym.

In 1980 Earth First! was founded by Dave Foreman and others to confront environmental destruction, primarily of the American West. Inspired by the Edward Abbey novel The Monkey Wrench Gang, Earth First! made use of such techniques as treesitting and treespiking to stop logging companies, as well as other activities targeted towards mining, road construction, suburban development, and energy companies.

The organization was committed to nonviolent ecotage techniques from the group's inception. Others split from the movement in the 1990s, including the Earth Liberation Front (ELF) in 1992, which named itself after the Animal Liberation Front (ALF) which had formed in the 1970s. Three years later in Canada, inspired by the ELF in Europe, the first Earth Liberation direct action occurred, but this time as the Earth Liberation Army (ELA), a similar movement who use ecotage and monkeywrenching as a tool.

A series of actions earned ELF the label of eco-terrorists, including the burning of a ski resort in Vail, Colorado in 1998, and the burning of an SUV dealership in Oregon in 1999. In the same year the ELA made headlines by setting fire to the Vail Resorts in Washington, D.C., causing $12 million in damages. The defendants in that case were later charged in the FBI's "Operation Backfire" with other crimes; this was later named by environmentalists as the Green Scare, alluding to the Red Scare periods of fear over communist infiltration of U.S.

Following the September 11, 2001 attacks several laws were passed increasing the penalty for ecoterrorism, and the U.S. Congress held hearings on the activity of groups such as the ELF. To date no one has been killed as a result of an ELF or ALF action, and both groups forbid harming human or non-human life. It was announced in 2003 that "eco-terrorist" attacks, known as "ecotage", had increased from the ELF, ELA, and the "Environmental Rangers", another name used by activists when engaging in similar activity.

In 2005 the FBI announced that the ELF was America's greatest domestic terrorist threat, responsible for over 1,200 "criminal incidents" amounting to tens of millions of dollars in damage to property. The United States Department of Homeland Security confirmed this with regards to both the ALF and ELF.

Movements/organizations
Camp for Climate Action
Earth First!
Earth Liberation Army (ELA)
Earth Liberation Front (ELF)
Environmental Life Force
Plane Stupid
Antifa

Anti-abortion militancy
Anti-abortion militants The Army of God use leaderless resistance as their organizing principle. As of 2009, The Army of God's webpage hosts a reprint of an article entitled "Leaderless Resistance" from a publication called The Seditionist.

Countermeasures

Network analysis in classical setting
Leaderless resistance social networks are potentially vulnerable to social network analysis and its derivative, link analysis. Link analysis of social networks is the fundamental reason for the ongoing legislative push in the U.S. and the European Union  for mandatory retention of telecommunication traffic data and for limiting access to anonymous prepaid cellphones, as the stored data contain important network analysis clues.

Network analysis was successfully used by French Colonel Yves Godard to break the Algerian resistance between 1955 and 1957 and force them to cease their bombing campaigns. The Algerian conflict may be better described as guerrilla in nature rather than leaderless resistance (see Modern Warfare by Col. Roger Trinquier), and this illustrates the weakness of cell-structured insurgents when compared to leaderless ones.  were obtained by the use of informants and torture and were used to obtain the identities of important individuals in the resistance; these individuals were then assassinated, which disrupted the Algerian resistance networks. The more irreplaceable the individual is in the adversary's network, the greater the damage is done to the network by removing them.

Advantages of leaderless resistance
Traditional organizations leave behind much evidence of their activities, such as money trails, and training and recruitment material. Leaderless resistances, supported more by ideologies than organizations, generally lack such traces. The effects of their operations, as reported by the mass media, act as a sort of messaging and recruitment advertising.

 argues that leaderless resistance movements can avoid the ideological disputes and infighting that plague radical groups.

The internet provides counterinsurgents with further challenges. Individual cells (and even a single person can be a cell) can communicate over the internet, anonymously or semi-anonymously sharing information online, to be found by others through well-known websites. Even when it is legally and technically possible to ascertain who accessed what, it is often practically impossible to discern in a reasonable timeframe who is a real threat and who is just curious, a journalist, or a web crawler.

Despite these advantages, leaderless resistance is often unstable. If the actions are not frequent enough or not successful, the stream of publicity, which serves as the recruiting, motivation, and coordination drives for other cells, diminishes. On the other hand, if the actions are too successful, support groups and other social structures will form that are vulnerable to network analysis.

In fiction
The 1970 novel A Piece of Resistance, re-published in the US in 2004 under the title  Never Surrender  by Clive Egleton depicts resistance to a Soviet occupation of England.
The 1996 novel Unintended Consequences by John Ross portrays a successful rebellion by the American heartland after decades of bullying by faraway Washington.

See also
 Asymmetric warfare
 Clandestine cell system
 Individualist anarchism
 Insurrectionary anarchism
 Lone wolf (terrorism)
 James C. Scott
 Social peer-to-peer processes
 The Starfish and the Spider
 Shaheen Bagh Protests

References

Further reading
 The Leaderless Revolution: How Ordinary People Will Take Power and Change Politics In the 21st Century, by Carne Ross (2011)

External links
 An Introduction To Terrorist Organisational Structures
 Networks and Netwars - PDF book by RAND Corporation.
 Leaderless Resistance - the original essay
 Simson Garfinkel - "Leaderless resistance today"
 The History, Definition, & Use of the Term "Leaderless Resistance"

Activism by type
Guerrilla warfare
Secret societies
Social movements
Terrorism tactics